William Wilson, or variants, may refer to:

Politicians

American 
 Bill Wilson (activist) (born 1953), small government activist
 Bill Wilson (Montana politician) (born 1961), Montana state representative
 W. Eugene Wilson (William Eugene Wilson, 1929–2015), member of the North Carolina General Assembly
 Will Wilson (Texas politician) (1912–2005), American politician, attorney, and judge in Texas
 William A. Wilson (diplomat) (1914–2009), first U.S. Ambassador to the Holy See
 William Bauchop Wilson (1862–1934), U.S. (Scottish-born) labor leader and political figure
 SS William B. Wilson, a Liberty ship 
 William C. Wilson (New York politician), New York comptroller in 1906
 William E. Wilson (Indiana politician) (1870–1948), U.S. Representative from Indiana
 William H. Wilson (New York politician) (c. 1873–1901), New York assemblyman
 William H. Wilson (1877–1937), U.S. Representative from Pennsylvania, 1935–1937
 William K. Wilson (1817–1898), Wisconsin state senator
 William Lyne Wilson (1843–1900), United States Postmaster General
 William Sydney Wilson (1816–1862), Confederate politician
 William T. Wilson (born 1937), member of the Virginia House of Delegates
 William Warfield Wilson (1868–1942), U.S. Representative from Illinois
 William Wilson (Iowa politician) (1820–1900), Iowa state senator
 William M. Wilson (Iowa politician) (1838–1904), Iowa state senator
 William Wilson (Ohio politician) (1773–1827), U.S. Representative from Ohio
 William Wilson (Pennsylvania politician), U.S. Representative from Pennsylvania, 1815–1819
 William Wilson (Wisconsin politician), Wisconsin state senator
 Bill Wilson, mayor of Santa Clara, California, founder of the Bill Wilson Center for homeless youth

British 
 William Wilson (died 1582), MP for Southwark
 William Wilson (1720–1796), British Member of Parliament for Ilchester, 1761–1768
 William Wilson (Donegal MP) (1836–1876), MP for Donegal 1876–1879
 William Wilson (Westhoughton MP) (1855–1921), British trade unionist and Member of Parliament for Westhoughton
 William Wilson (Coventry MP) (1913–2010), British Labour Member of Parliament, 1964–1983
 Bill Wilson (Scottish politician) (William L. Wilson, born 1963), Scottish nationalist

Canadian 
 Bill Wilson (chief)
 William Wilson (British Columbia politician) (1838–1922), merchant and politician in British Columbia
 William Wilson (New Brunswick politician) (1845–1921), Canadian politician in the Legislative Assembly of New Brunswick
 William Wilson (Upper Canada politician) (1789–1847), politician in Upper Canada
 William Wallace Wilson (1876–1967), Alberta politician
 William Wilber Wilfred Wilson (1885–1964), Canadian politician

Australian 
 William Wilson (Queensland politician) (1832–1903), member of the Queensland Legislative Council
 William Wilson (Victorian politician) (1834–1891), member of the Victorian Legislative Assembly and Council

New Zealand 
 William Wilson (mayor) (1819–1897), first mayor of Christchurch, New Zealand, 1868

Sports

Association football
 William Wilson (defender), English footballer for Newcastle United and Bradford City
 William Wilson (footballer, born 1902) (1902–?), English footballer
 William Wilson (footballer, born 1915) (1915–?), English footballer
 William Wilson (footballer, born November 1915) (1915–?), English footballer
 William Wilson (footballer, born 1921), Scottish football goalkeeper for Queen of the South and Third Lanark
 Billy Wilson (footballer, born 1896) (1896–1996), English footballer
 Billy Wilson (footballer, born 1936), Northern Irish football player for Burnley
 Billy Wilson (footballer, born 1946) (1946–2018), English footballer
 Billy Wilson (American soccer) (fl. 1920s–30s), American soccer player
 Billy Wilson (Scottish footballer), played for Airdrieonians FC and managed Albion Rovers F.C.
 Willie Wilson (footballer, born 1894) (1894–1956), Scottish footballer, played for Hearts and Cowdenbeath
 Willie Wilson (footballer, born 1941) (1941–2001), Scottish footballer
 Willie Wilson (footballer, born 1972), Scottish footballer

Baseball
 William Wilson (baseball), American baseball player
 Will Wilson (baseball) (born 1998), American baseball player
 Willie Wilson (baseball) (born 1955), American baseball outfielder
 Willy Wilson (baseball) (1884–1925), baseball player
 Bill Wilson (catcher) (1867–1924), MLB catcher
 Bill Wilson (outfielder) (1928–2017), MLB outfielder
 Bill Wilson (pitcher) (1942–1993), Major League Baseball (MLB) pitcher
 Mookie Wilson (William Hayward Wilson, born 1956), MLB outfielder
 Mutt Wilson (William Clarence Wilson, 1896–1962), MLB pitcher

Cricket
 William Wilson (Australian sportsman) (1909–1976), Australian cricketer and Australian rules footballer for Essendon
 William Wilson (cricketer, born 1912) (born c. 1912), Australian cricketer
 William Wilson (South African cricketer) (1925-2005), South African cricketer
 Billy Wilson (cricketer) (1868–1920), Australian cricketer

Rugby
 Billy Wilson (Australian rugby league) (1927–1993), Australian rugby league footballer
 Billy Wilson (New Zealand rugby league), rugby league footballer of the 1910s, and 1920s for New Zealand, Wellington and Athletic
 Will Wilson (rugby union) (born 1997), English rugby union and rugby sevens player

Other sports
 William Wilson (field hockey) (1917–1984), American Olympic hockey player
 Billy Wilson (Australian rules footballer) (1891–1957), Australian footballer for Fitzroy
 Bill Wilson (footballer) (1924–1969), Australian rules footballer for Richmond and Glenelg
 Billy Wilson (wide receiver) (1927–2009), NFL wide receiver
 Billy Wilson (running back), college football player
 William Wilson (aquatics) (1844–1912), Scottish writer on swimming, and the inventor of water polo
 William George Wilson (1917–2007), sports cinematographer
 William Wilson (swimmer) (born 1964), Filipino swimmer
 Willy Wilson (born 1980), Filipino basketball player

Arts and entertainment
 William Wilson (architect) (1641–1710), English architect, builder and sculptor
 William Wilson (poet) (1801–1860), Scottish-American poet, bookseller and publisher
 W. J. Wilson  (William John Wilson, 1833–1909), actor, scene painter and stage manager
 William Hardy Wilson (1881–1955), Australian architect, artist and author
 William Wilson (artist) (1905–1972), Scottish stained glass artist, printmaker and watercolours
 William E. Wilson (writer) (1906–1988), American author and professor, son of the Indiana politician
 William Scott Wilson (born 1944), author and translator of samurai literature
 Will Wilson (artist) (born 1957), American painter of portraits, illustrations and trompe-l'œil works
 Will Wilson (photographer) (born 1969), Native American photographer
 William Wilson (vocalist), lead singer of Legion Within
 William Llewellyn Wilson, conductor, musician, teacher and music educator from Baltimore
 Willie Wilson (drummer) (born 1947), member of Quiver; worked with Pink Floyd, Al Stewart

Business
 William Proctor Wilson (1921–2010), president of Buttrick Publishing Company
 Willie Wilson (businessman) (born 1948), Chicago businessman, musician, philanthropist, and political candidate
 William Willson (businessman) (died 2015), chairman of Aston Martin, 1972–1975
 William Wilson, businessman, founder of Price's Candles
 Bill Wilson, founder of US firearms manufacturer Wilson Combat

Law and crime
 Billy Wilson (outlaw) (1862–1918), American outlaw who rode with Billy the Kid
 Bill Wilson (convict) (born 1880), convicted of murdering two individuals who were later found alive
 Billy Roy Wilson (William Roy Wilson Jr., born 1939), United States federal judge
 William Wilson (Illinois jurist) (1794–1857), Chief Justice of the Illinois Supreme Court
 Bill Wilson (judge), New Zealand judge of the Supreme Court and Court of Appeal
 William C. Wilson (judge) (1812–1882), Vermont lawyer and judge
 William Adam Wilson (1928–1994), professor of Scots Law at Edinburgh University
 William Rae Wilson (1772–1849), Scottish lawyer and travel writer

Military
 Sir William Deane Wilson (1843–1921), British army surgeon-general
 William Wilson (Medal of Honor) (1847–1895), one of nineteen people to receive the Medal of Honor twice
 William Othello Wilson (1867–1928), member of the US Army's 9th Cavalry, and recipient of the Medal of Honor
 William Tecumseh Wilson (1823–1905), American Union brevet brigadier general from Ohio
 William Wilson (Zouave) (1823–1874), American Union brevet brigadier general from New York

Religion
 William Wilson (priest) (1545–1615), Canon of Windsor
 William Wilson (Secession minister) (1690-1741), co-founder of the Secession Church
 William Carus Wilson (1791–1859), English churchman and founder and editor of The Children's Friend
 William Wilson (bishop) (1806–1888), Anglican bishop in Scotland
 William Wilson (Dundee minister) (1808–1888) Presbyterian minister, moderator of the Free Church
 William Hay Wilson (1864–1935), Anglican priest
 William C. Wilson (minister) (1866–1915), General Superintendent of the Church of the Nazarene
 William Lyall Wilson (1866–1914), minister of the Church of Scotland
 Bill Wilson (pastor) (born 1948), president and founder of Metro Ministries International
 William Wilson (academic) (born 1958), theologian affiliated with Oral Roberts University
 William Wilson (Dean of Cloyne), Dean of Cloyne, 1908–1934
 William Croft Wilson, American Congregational minister

Science
 William Wilson (botanist) (1799–1871), English botanist
 William James Erasmus Wilson (1809–1884), physician and surgeon
 William Edward Wilson (astronomer) (1851–1908), Irish astronomer
 William Parkinson Wilson (1826–1874), English astronomer and professor of mathematics
 William Wilson (English academic) (1875–1965), English physicist
 William Wilson (physicist) (1887–1948), English-born physicist
 William Hawkins Wilson (1866–1956), British physiologist

Others
 William "Amos" Wilson (1762–1821), folklore figure of southern Pennsylvania, referred to as "The Pennsylvania Hermit"
 William A. Wilson (folklorist) (1933–2016), studied and taught Mormon folklore
 Bill W. (William Griffith Wilson, 1895–1971), co-founder of Alcoholics Anonymous
 Edward Wilson (explorer) (1872–1912), known as Uncle Bill, Antarctic explorer
 William Wilson (engineer) (1809–1862), first locomotive driver in Germany, railway pioneer
 William E. Wilson, British railway civil engineer, first employer of John Harry Grainger
 William Julius Wilson (born 1935), sociologist
 William L. Wilson (Rice University), professor at Rice University

In fiction
"William Wilson" (short story), an 1839 short story by Edgar Allan Poe
"William Wilson", a song from The Smithereens' 1989 album 11
Wilson the Wonder Athlete (William Wilson), a character in British story and comic papers published by D.C. Thomson
Billy Wilson, a character in Angels with Broken Wings
Agent Bill Wilson, also known as CIA, a character in The Dark Knight Rises

See also
 William Willson (disambiguation)